Irfan Razack (born 30 October 1953) is an Indian billionaire entrepreneur from Bangalore. He is the Chairman and Managing Director of Prestige Group, one of the reputed property developers in India. According to 2014 Forbes India Rich List, he was the 77th wealthiest Indian, with a personal wealth of $1.23 billion, and Prestige was the second largest listed property firm in India.

He is also the Chairman and Co-Founder of Inventure Academy, Bangalore, and was Honorary secretary of Al-Ameen Educational Society, President of Bangalore Commercial Association (BCA) and Chairman of CREDAI.

He is a kutchi Memon and has been actively involved in the upliftment of the people of the community through the Kutchi Memon Jamat, Bangalore.

He has received many awards for his business excellence such as Real Estate Excellence Award (2008), Best Developer Award (2009) by Karnataka State Town Planning Development and Entrepreneur Extraordinirine Award (2010) by Builders Association of India and Confederation of Real Estate Developers Association of India.

References

External links

Irfan Razack speaks about COVID-19 impact on FMCG sector, fiscal stimulus

Businesspeople from Bangalore
Memon people
Living people
1953 births
Indian real estate businesspeople